Go Geon-han is a South Korean actor and model. He is known for his roles in dramas such as Clean with Passion for Now, The Tale of Nokdu and Sweet Home. He also appeared in movies Friend: The Great Legacy and The Battle of Jangsari.

Filmography

Television series

Film

References

External links
 

1988 births
Living people
South Korean male models
21st-century South Korean male actors
South Korean male film actors
South Korean male television actors